The Louisiana Circuit Courts of Appeal are the intermediate appellate courts for the state of Louisiana.

There are five circuits, each covering a different group of parishes.  Each circuit is subdivided into three districts.

As with the Louisiana Supreme Court, the regular judicial terms on the courts of appeal are ten years.

The courts of appeal are housed in the following cities in Louisiana:

First Circuit – Baton Rouge

Second Circuit – Shreveport

Third Circuit – Lake Charles

Fourth Circuit – New Orleans

Fifth Circuit – Gretna

Jurisdiction
The Circuit Courts of Appeal have appellate jurisdiction over all civil matters,  all matters appealed from family and juvenile courts, and most criminal cases that are triable by a jury.  A court of appeal also has supervisory jurisdiction to review interlocutory orders and decrees in cases which are heard in the trial courts within their geographical circuits. 
One unique feature of the Courts of Appeal of Louisiana is that they are able to review questions of fact, as well as questions of law, in civil cases.  In appeals of criminal cases, however, the appellate jurisdiction of the courts of appeal extends only to questions of law.

1st Circuit

Parishes Included:
1st District: Ascension, Assumption, Iberville, Lafourche, Pointe Coupee, St. Mary, Terrebonne, and West Baton Rouge
2nd District: East Baton Rouge
3rd District: East Feliciana, Livingston, St. Helena, St. Tammany, Tangipahoa, Washington, and West Feliciana

Circuit Seat: First Circuit Courthouse (Baton Rouge)

2nd Circuit

Parishes Included: Bienville, Bossier, Caddo, Caldwell, Claiborne, DeSoto, East Carroll, Franklin, Jackson, Lincoln, Madison, Morehouse, Ouachita, Red River, Richland, Tensas, Union, Webster, West Carroll, Winn

Circuit Seat: Second Circuit Courthouse (Shreveport)

3rd Circuit

Parishes Included: Acadia, Allen, Avoyelles, Beauregard, Calcasieu, Cameron, Catahoula, Concordia, Evangeline, Grant, Iberia, Jefferson Davis, Lafayette, LaSalle, Natchitoches, Rapides, Sabine, St. Landry, St. Martin, Vermilion, Vernon

Circuit Seat: Third Circuit Courthouse (Lake Charles)

4th Circuit

Parishes Included: Orleans, Plaquemines, St. Bernard

Circuit Seat: Fourth Circuit Courthouse (New Orleans)

5th Circuit

Parishes Included: Jefferson, St. Charles, St. James, St. John the Baptist

Circuit Seat: Fifth Circuit Courthouse (Gretna)

References

External links
 Louisiana First Circuit Court of Appeal homepage
 Louisiana Second Circuit Court of Appeal homepage
 Louisiana Third Circuit Court of Appeal homepage
 Louisiana Fourth Circuit Court of Appeal homepage
 Louisiana Fifth Circuit Court of Appeal homepage

Louisiana
State appellate courts of the United States
Louisiana state courts
Courts and tribunals with year of establishment missing